Xinkai is a Chinese car manufacturer.

Xinkai may also refer to:

Populated places
, a town in Huangmei County, Hebei Province
, a town in Panjin City, Liaoning Province
, a town in Yueyang County, Hunan Province
Xinkai Village, in Daxin, Jiangsu
Xinkai Village, in Fukou, Lianyuan City, Hunan Province
Xinkai Village, in Liucun, Beijing
Xinkai Village, in Longfu, Liuyang City, Hunan Province

Other
, a tributary of northeast China's Liao River

See also
Lake Khanka or Lake Xingkai, a freshwater lake on the border between Russia and northeast China
Shinkai (disambiguation)